Raj Kumar Patel is social worker and a political full-time active member of Indian National Congress Bhopal, Madhya Pradesh. A leader of the Indian National Congress, he was MLA, Budhni 1993-1998 and also Minister of State for School Education, Sports and Youth Affairs, Govt. of Madhya Pradesh. He was also ex Gen. Secretary, NSUI Madhya Pradesh and ex Member of AICC.

Early life and education

Raj Kumar Patel was born to the Kirar Thakur family in the Baktara village of Sehore district. He is a M. A. LLB. from Govt. Hamidia Arts, Commerce and Law College, Bhopal, Barkatullah University, Bhopal. He was Agriculturist by profession prior to politics.कांग्रेस पार्टी

References

Living people
Madhya Pradesh MLAs 1998–2003
Politicians from Bhopal
State cabinet ministers of Madhya Pradesh
Year of birth missing (living people)
People from Sehore district